Lussier Hot Springs is an undeveloped hot spring just inside Whiteswan Lake Provincial Park in British Columbia, a province of Canada.

History 

The hot springs are in traditional territory of the Ktunaxa people. In the early 20th century, the springs were used by prospectors, trappers and guides.

Features 

The springs are made up of several rock pools with gravel bottoms.  The hottest pool is up to 43°C, and then the water cools to about 37°C as it flows down through the rest towards the Lussier River.

References

External links 
Area map

Hot springs of British Columbia
East Kootenay